Sach'a Hirka (Quechua sach'a tree, Ancash Quechua hirka mountain, "tree mountain", also spelled Sachajirca) is a mountain in the Cordillera Negra in the Andes of Peru which reaches a height of approximately . It lies in the Ancash Region on the border of the Aija Province, Aija District, and the Recuay Province, Catac District. Sach'a Hirka lies northwest of Yana Kunkush.

References

Mountains of Peru
Mountains of Ancash Region